Mount Aberdeen  is a  mountain summit located in the Lake Louise area of Banff National Park, in the Canadian Rockies of Alberta, Canada. Its nearest higher peak is Mount Lefroy,  to the southwest. Haddo Peak is on the same massif with Mount Aberdeen, and the Aberdeen Glacier is between the two peaks.

History
Mount Aberdeen was named by James J. McArthur in 1897 for Lord Aberdeen, 7th Governor General of Canada. Prior to 1897 it was known as Hazel Peak, but there is no record of who Hazel was.

The first ascent of the peak was made in 1894 by Samuel E.S. Allen, L.F. Frissel, and Walter D. Wilcox. In 1917, V.A. Flynn reached the summit by traversing from the top of Haddo Peak with a descent to the Aberdeen Glacier and then up over steep snow and an ice arête.

The mountain's name was made official in 1952 by the Geographical Names Board of Canada.

Geology

Like other mountains in Banff Park, Mount Aberdeen is composed of sedimentary rock laid down during the Precambrian to Jurassic periods. Formed in shallow seas, this sedimentary rock was pushed east and over the top of younger rock during the Laramide orogeny.

Climate

Based on the Köppen climate classification, this mountain is located in a subarctic climate zone with cold, snowy winters, and mild summers. Temperatures can drop below  with wind chill factors below .

See also
List of mountains in the Canadian Rockies
Geology of Alberta

References

External links

 Parks Canada web site: Banff National Park

Three-thousanders of Alberta
Mountains of Banff National Park